The 2017–18 Lipscomb Bisons men's basketball team represented Lipscomb University during the 2017–18 NCAA Division I men's basketball season. The Bisons, led by fifth-year head coach Casey Alexander, played their home games at Allen Arena in Nashville, Tennessee as members of the Atlantic Sun Conference. They finished the season 23–10, 10–4 in ASUN play to finish in second place. They defeated Stetson, Jacksonville and Florida Gulf Coast to become champions of the ASUN tournament. They earned the ASUN's automatic bid to the NCAA tournament where they lost in the first round to North Carolina.

Previous season
The Bisons finished the 2016–17 season 20–13, 11–3 in ASUN play to finish in second place. As the No. 2 seed in the ASUN tournament, they defeated NJIT in the quarterfinals to advance to the semifinals where they lost to North Florida. Despite having 20 wins, they did not participate in a postseason tournament.

Offseason

Departures

Incoming transfers

2017 recruiting class

Roster

Schedule and results
 
|-
!colspan=9 style=| Non-conference regular season

|-
!colspan=9 style=| Atlantic Sun Conference regular season

|-
!colspan=9 style=| Atlantic Sun tournament

|-
!colspan=9 style=| NCAA tournament

References

Lipscomb Bisons men's basketball seasons
Lipscomb
Lipscomb